The 2000 United States Senate special election in Georgia was held on November 7, 2000. Incumbent Democratic U.S. Senator Zell Miller, who was appointed by Governor Roy Barnes to replace the deceased Paul Coverdell, overwhelmingly won re-election to serve the remainder of the term. Miller defeated Republican Mack Mattingly, a former U.S. Senator in a landslide of over 20 points, carrying 110 of the state's 120 counties.

This was the last time until 2021 that a Democrat would win a U.S. Senate seat in Georgia, when Raphael Warnock won a special election to fill the same seat and Jon Ossoff won the regular election for the Class 2 Senate seat. It also remains the last time that a Democrat would win a Senate race in the state by double-digits.

Candidates
Note: This election was a non-partisan election due to it being a special election. Each candidate ran without a party. The parties below reflect which party label each candidate would have run under if given the option.

 Ben Ballenger (Republican)
 Jeff Gates (Green)
 Paul Robert MacGregor (Libertarian)
 Winnie Walsh (Independent)
 Mack Mattingly,  former Ambassador to Seychelles and former U.S. Senator (Republican)
 Zell Miller, incumbent U.S. Senator and former Governor (Democratic)
 Bobby Wood (Republican)

Campaign 
One of the biggest campaign issues was Social Security. Miller attacked Mattingly for supporting a raise in the retirement age. The Republican fought back by connecting him to liberal Democrat Ted Kennedy of Massachusetts, and on his vote to block legislation aimed at protecting Social Security. Mattingly said he would vote for Texas Governor George W. Bush for president, who was very popular in the state and led Vice President Al Gore in many Georgia polls. Mattingly then asked Miller who he was supporting in the presidential election. Miller conceded he would vote for Gore because he helped him when he was governor including drought relief, welfare reform, and the Atlanta Olympics. "That does not mean I agree with all of his policies," he concluded. In early October, a poll showed Miller leading with 59% of the vote, despite the fact that Bush was leading Gore by a double-digit margin.

Debates
Complete video of debate, October 15, 2000

Results

See also 
 2000 United States Senate elections

References 

Georgia 2000
Georgia 2000
2000 Special
Georgia Special
United States Senate Special
United States Senate 2000